Fly ash brick (FAB) is a building material, specifically masonry units, containing  fly ash and water. Owing to the high concentration of calcium oxide in  fly ash, the brick is described as "self-cementing". The manufacturing method saves energy, reduces mercury pollution in the environment, and often costs 20% less than traditional clay brick manufacturing.

History 
Coal dust has historically been collected as a waste product from homes and industry. During the nineteenth century coal ash was taken by 'scavengers' and delivered to local brick works, where the ash would be mixed with clay. The income from the sale of ash would normally pay for the collection of waste.

Clay is typically entrapped during the formation of coal. When coal is burnt, the incombustible clay particles are left behind as ash. In grate boilers, incombustible ash agglomerates as cinders through prolonged residential time. Nowadays, pulverised coal technology is preferred due to its improved energy-efficiency. In this case, the ground clay escapes along with flue gases, settling as ash in bag filters or electro static precipitators (ESPs). This gives rise to the name 'fly ash'.

The raw materials 

A possible material mix for the production of fly ash brick:

The strength of fly ash brick manufactured with the above compositions is ranges between 7.5 MPa and 10 MPa. Fly ash bricks are lighter and stronger than clay bricks.

Main ingredients include fly ash, water, quicklime or lime sludge, cement, aluminum powder and gypsum. Autoclaving increases the hardness of the block by promoting quick curing of the cement. Gypsum acts as a long term strength gainer. The chemical reaction due to the aluminum paste provides AAC its distinct porous structure, lightness, and insulating properties. The aforementioned properties set it apart from other lightweight concrete materials. The finished product is a lighter block, less than 40% the weight of conventional Bricks, while providing the similar strengths. The specific gravity stays around 0.6 to 0.65. Using these blocks in buildings reduces the dead load, allowing one to save around 30 to 35% of structural steel, and concrete.

Commercial processes fall into two categories; the lime route, and the cement (OPC) route where the latter is used as a source of lime. In the lime route, the composition is fly ash (50%), slaked lime (30%), and anhydrous gypsum (20%), to which 3 to 4 times of stone dust, sand or any inert filler material can be added. In the cement route, the composition is fly ash(76%), OPC (20%), and anhydrite (4%), to which 3 to 4 times of filler material can be added.

The following properties of fly ash affect the strength and look of fly ash bricks.
 Loss on Ignition (LOI): fly ash loses weight when it burns at about 1000 °C due to presence of carbon and water. The weight loss happens due to carbon combustion and moisture evaporation is called "Loss on Ignition(LOI)". This is expressed as percentage. The lower the loss of Ignition, the better will be fly ash. As per BIS it should not be more than 5%.
 Fineness: fine fly ash has more surface area available to react with lime. This increases pozzolanic activity, which contributes to the strength of fly ash bricks. As per BIS it should not be more than 320 m2/kg.
 Calcium (CaO) content: the pozzolanic reactivity of fly ash is more in high calcium fly ash. The greater the pozzolanic activity leads to higher the strength of fly ash brick. As per ASTM C618 fly ash is classified into two types: Class C contains more than 10% lime and Class F fly ash contains less than 10% lime. 
Based on boiler operations, fly ash can be additionally classified as LT (low temperature) and HT (high temperature). LT fly ash containing amorphous phases is generated where boiler temperature is not more than 800 °C, whereas HT fly ash containing glassy reactive phases is generated at more than 1000 °C in super thermal plants. LT fly ash reacts well with lime whereas HT fly ash reacts well with OPC.

Advantages 
 It reduces dead load on structures due to light weight (2.6 kg, dimension: 230 mm X 110 mm X 70 mm). 
 Same number of bricks will cover more area than clay bricks
 High fire Insulation
 Due to high strength, practically no breakage during transport and use. 
 Due to uniform size of bricks mortar required for joints and plaster reduces almost by 50%. 
 Due to lower water penetration seepage of water through bricks is considerably reduced. 
 Gypsum plaster can be directly applied on these bricks without a backing coat of lime plaster.
 These bricks do not require soaking in water for 24 hours. Sprinkling of water before use is enough.

Disadvantages 
Depending on the mixture mechanical strength can be low. This can be partially rectified by adding marble waste or mortar between blocks.
 Large size can have more breakages depending on the mix of materials.
It has high thermal conductivity. Extra insulation is required in colder regions.

References 

Bricks